Blaschette is a small town in the commune of Lorentzweiler, in central Luxembourg.  , it has a population of 447.

Lorentzweiler
Towns in Luxembourg